This article lists governors of Trinidad and Tobago.

Governors of Trinidad and Tobago 1889–1962

See also
List of governors of Trinidad
List of governors of Tobago
List of heads of state of Trinidad and Tobago
List of prime ministers of Trinidad and Tobago

References

Governors
Trinidad and Tobago